Stockton High School (1904–1966), home of the Tarzans, was a high school in Stockton, California, part of the Stockton Unified School District. It opened in 1904 on property bounded by Harding Way, Vine, San Joaquin and California streets. The main building of the old high school, which became Stockton Junior High School in 1948, was deemed unsafe and demolished in 1966. The rest of the buildings were not earthquake safe and abandoned and demolished. Commodore Skills School opened on the grounds in 1979 and later moved to the building that was formerly Webster Middle School.

California Concerts (also referred to as Jazz Goes to High School) is a live album by saxophonist and bandleader Gerry Mulligan featuring performances recorded at the Stockton High School and Herbert Hoover High School.

During World War II, Stockton High "sponsored" 275 jeeps in the Schools at War program.

Notable alumni
 Gil Evans (born Green; 1912–1988) Canadian-American jazz pianist, arranger, composer and bandleader
 Andrew Osborne Hayfield, Minnesota state legislator and businessman
 Joe Allen Hong, fashion designer who designed Grace Kelly's grooms-maid's wedding dresses at her wedding
 Dolores Huerta, labor rights activist
 Harry Lochhead, baseball player
 Janet Leigh (1927–2004), actress from Psycho
 Nicholas Mayall (1906–1993; Class of 1924) observational astronomer at the Lick Observatory, and MIT's Radiation Laboratory during World War II
 David Rowland (1924–2010, Class of 1942) an American industrial designer noted for inventing the 40/4 Chair
 Oscar Stanage (1883–1964) an American baseball catcher

Notable faculty
 Lawrence Edwin Siemering, football coach, also coached at the college, NFL and CFL levels

References

History of Stockton, California
High schools in San Joaquin County, California
Educational institutions established in 1904
Educational institutions disestablished in 1948
1904 establishments in California